Fleur Maxwell (born 5 August 1988) is a Luxembourgian former figure skater. She has won nine senior international medals. She reached the free skate at the 2006 Winter Olympics and at six ISU Championships, achieving her highest result, 14th, at the 2005 European Championships.

Career 
Maxwell started skating at the age of nine. She debuted on the junior international level in the 2002–03 season. Ranked 32nd at the 2003 World Junior Championships, she placed 18th the following year in The Hague, Netherlands.

Maxwell won the silver medal at the 2004 International Challenge Cup, her senior international debut. Her first senior ISU Championship was the 2005 European Championships in Turin, Italy. She finished 14th at the event and then 29th at the 2005 World Championships. At the Karl Schäfer Memorial in October 2005, Maxwell won the bronze medal and qualified to compete at the Olympics in Turin. As the only Luxembourg competitor at the 2006 Winter Olympics, she was the flag bearer for her country. Placing 21st in the short program, she qualified for the free skate and finished 24th overall in ladies' singles. She then retired from competitive skating.

Maxwell returned to competition in the 2009–10 season. She did not qualify for the 2010 Winter Olympics in Vancouver or the 2014 Winter Olympics in Sochi but won medals at the Istanbul Cup, Slovenia Open, Ukrainian Open, Denkova-Staviski Cup, and NRW Trophy.

Asteroid 255019 Fleurmaxwell, discovered by astronomer Matt Dawson in 2005, was named in her honor. The official  was published by the Minor Planet Center on 15 July 2011.

Programs

Results 
GP: Grand Prix; CS: Challenger Series; JGP: Junior Grand Prix

Career post-retirement 

Since retiring permanently from competition in 2017, Maxwell has focused on building a successful and high profile career in personal training. Her brand - BodyByFleur - claims to be a 'transformational full body fitness method', and has built a substantial social media following, with over 13,000 followers on Instagram.

Personal life 

The sociologist Claire Maxwell is Maxwell's eldest sister.

References

External links 

 

Luxembourgian figure skaters
Olympic figure skaters of Luxembourg
Figure skaters at the 2006 Winter Olympics
1988 births
Living people
People from Dudelange
Luxembourgian sportswomen